The Presidential Service Badge (PSB) is an identification badge of the United States Armed Forces which is awarded to members of the U.S. Army, U.S. Navy, U.S. Air Force, U.S. Space Force, U.S. Marine Corps, and U.S. Coast Guard as well as other members of the Uniformed Services, such as the U.S. National Oceanic and Atmospheric Administration Commissioned Corps and the U.S. Public Health Service Commissioned Corps, who serve as full-time military staff to the President of the United States.

Overview
 of June 1, 1960 was signed by President Dwight D. Eisenhower establishing a White House Service Badge. President Lyndon B. Johnson retired the White House Service Badge and issued a separate Presidential Service Badge by signing  on September 1, 1964.

Typical recipients include:
 Military aides to the President appointed from each of the services (pay grade O-4 or O-5) who, among other duties, rotate being the so-called "Emergency War Officer" with "The Football", a briefcase containing nuclear decision-making tools kept within ready access of the president at all times,
 The White House Naval Mess Facility (Presidential Food Service) located in the West Wing of the White House and the OEOB,
 White House military public affairs officers,
 Servicemembers assigned to the White House Communications Agency (WHCA), which supports presidential communications worldwide,
 Servicemembers assigned to the White House Transportation Agency (WHTA), which provides motor vehicle transportation to the White House as directed by the White House Military Office,
 Servicemembers assigned to the White House Medical Unit (WHMU) which provides medical support to President, Vice President and their families as well as the White House staff,
 "Air Force One" airmen assigned to the Presidential Airlift Group (PAG) of the 89th Airlift Wing at Andrews AFB, Maryland,
 Naval personnel assigned to Camp David (Naval Support Facility Thurmont),
 Marine Helicopter Squadron 1 (HMX-1) "Marine One" flight crew,
 Marines assigned to the Marine Security Company at Camp David,
 White House Marine sentries.

The PSB is awarded after at least one year of satisfactory service "to any member of the Armed Forces assigned to duty in the White House Office or to military units and support facilities under the administration of the Military Assistant to the President by the Secretary of the Army, the Secretary of the Navy, the Secretary of the Air Force, or, when the Coast Guard is not operating as a service in the Navy, the Secretary of Homeland Security, upon recommendation of the Military Assistant to the President". It is accompanied by a certificate and miniature lapel version.  The PSB is recorded in the individual's military service records and is authorized for wear as a permanent decoration.

Recipients are, other than the President and uniformed members of the U.S. Secret Service, the only Americans authorized to wear the "Presidential Seal or Coat of Arms" on their uniforms and civilian clothes.

A similar badge, the Vice Presidential Service Badge, exists for military personnel assigned to assist the Vice President of the United States.

Presidential Service Association
The Presidential Service Association is a non-profit organization for United States armed services personnel and veterans who have received the Presidential Service Badge by serving in the White House in Washington, D.C., United States. The organization was created to provide a network of personnel, to construct a history of their service and to demonstrate the traditions and pride of that service. It furnishes scholarships, grants or crisis funds for United States armed services personnel and veterans who served in the White House prior to or after the creation of the White House Service Certificate, the Presidential Service Badge/Certificate or the Vice Presidential Service Certificate/Badge. President Dwight D. Eisenhower called the decoration a symbol of "...deserved honor and distinction."  Each recipient has their name linked to a serial number held at the White House.

Presidential Service Center
The Presidential Service Center is a non-profit organization celebrating civilian aides and employees of the United States presidency, and armed services personnel lawfully awarded a serial-numbered Presidential Service Badge by serving the White House and White House Military Office. It is jointly located with the Presidential Culinary Museum. The center displays glass case exhibits of the history of service, machines with facilities maintained and historical remembrances. It contains numerous artifacts, antiques, and items sent by the National Archives and Presidential foundations supporting it.  The center and museum have been featured in over 130 newspapers, worldwide, as well as on CNN International and PBS television.  The center contains numerous Presidential Service badges on display and one of the largest on public display.  It is located in Grover, North Carolina, a town named after President of the United States Grover Cleveland.

See also
 Vice Presidential Service Badge
 Identification badges of the Uniform Services of the United States
 Military badges of the United States
 Yankee White

References

External links
  History of the PSB
 Presidential Service Association
 Presidential Service Center
 Presidential Culinary Museum

United States military badges
Clubs and societies in the United States
Essex County, Massachusetts
Non-profit organizations based in Massachusetts
Service organizations based in the United States
Presidency of the United States